Jussi M. Hanhimäki (born February 3, 1965 in Espoo) is a Finnish historian, specializing in the history of the Cold War, American foreign policy, transatlantic relations, international organizations and refugees.

Background 

Hanhimäki is currently professor of international history at the Graduate Institute of International and Development Studies, in Geneva. He has previously taught at the London School of Economics and Political Science. His book The Flawed Architect: Henry Kissinger and American Foreign Policy has been acclaimed by his academic peers. In the US media, however, its reception was lukewarm and the book was criticized for representing "standard-issue European leftist" views.
In 2006, Hanhimäki was named Finland Distinguished Professor by the  Academy of Finland. He earned his MA, American History (1987) and Ph.D., International History (1993) at Boston University. His BA in History is from Tampere University in 1986.

Work 
Hanhimäki has published or edited a dozen books.  Among these, The Flawed Architect: Henry Kissinger and American Foreign Policy (2004) was awarded the Bernath Lecture Prize by the Society for Historians of American Foreign Relations, the leading learned society for the academic study of the history of United States foreign policy.  He is one of the founding editors of the journal Cold War History and edited, together with Odd Arne Westad, The Cold War: A History in Documents and Eyewitness Accounts (2003, 2004).  His articles have appeared in Cold War History, Diplomacy and Statecraft, Diplomatic History, Journal of Transatlantic Studies, Refugee Survey Quarterly, Politique étrangère, and Ulkopolitiikka.

Hanhimäki's most recent books are The Rise and Fall of Detente: American Foreign Policy and the Transformation of the Cold War and, together with Benedikt Schoenborn and Barbara Zanchetta, Transatlantic Relations since 1945: An Introduction.  In 2013 he published, together with Bernhard Blumenau, An International History of Terrorism: Western and Non-Western Experiences.

As well as his work at the Graduate Institute of International Studies, Hanhimäki has held Visiting Fellowships at LSE IDEAS, the Woodrow Wilson International Center for Scholars, and Harvard University. He has received major grants for research from the Swiss National Science Foundation, the Academy of Finland and the Social Sciences and Humanities Research Council of Canada.

Bibliography 

Hanhimäki, J., Rinnakkaiseloa patoamassa: Yhdysvallat ja Paasikiven linja: 1948-1956, 1996 (Svenska Handelshögskolans Studentkår)
Hanhimäki, J., An Insecure Friendship: the United States and Scandinavia Since 1945, 1997 (Palgrave Macmillan) 
Hanhimäki, J., Containing Coexistence: America, Russia, and the ‘Finnish Solution,’ 1945-1956, 1997 (Kent State University Press)
Best, A., Hanhimäki, J., Maiolo, J., Schultze, K., International History of the Twentieth Century 2003 (Routledge) 
Hanhimäki, J., Westad, O. A., The Cold War: A History in Documents and Eyewitness Accounts, 2003 (Oxford University Press)
Hanhimäki, J., The Flawed Architect: Henry Kissinger and American Foreign Policy, 2004 (Oxford University Press)
Hanhimäki, J., United Nations: A Very Short Introduction, 2008 (Oxford University Press)
Basil, G., Hanhimäki, J., Soutou, G.-H. (eds), Routledge Handbook of Transatlantic Security, 2010 (Routledge)
Hanhimäki, J., Schoenborn, B., Zanchetta, B., Transatlantic Relations Since 1945: An Introduction, 2012 (Routledge) 
Hanhimäki, J., Blumenau, B (eds), An International History of Terrorism: Western and Non-Western Experiences, 2013 (Routledge)
Hanhimäki, J., The Rise and Fall of Détente: American Foreign Policy and the Transformation of the Cold War, 2013 (Potomac Books) 
Hanhimäki, J., Pax Transatlantica: America and Europe in the Post-Cold War Era, 2021 (Oxford University Press)

References

External links 
Jussi M. Hanhimäki faculty page.

Academic staff of the Graduate Institute of International and Development Studies
1965 births
20th-century Finnish historians
Cold War historians
Living people
Boston University College of Arts and Sciences alumni
University of Tampere alumni
Finnish expatriates in Switzerland
21st-century Finnish historians